The Ipixuna River or Paranápixuna River is a river of Amazonas state in north-western Brazil.
It is a tributary of the Purus River. The confluence of these two rivers is at Tapauá.

The Ipixuna River flows from south to north through the  Tapauá State Forest, created in 2009, before joining the Purus river from the right at Tapauá.
The river flows through the Purus-Madeira moist forests ecoregion in its upper reaches.
It flows through the Purus várzea ecoregion before joining the Purus.

See also
List of rivers of Amazonas

References

Sources

Rivers of Amazonas (Brazilian state)